Paragon may refer to:

Places
Paragon, Indiana, a town in the United States
Paragon, Nebraska, former community in the United States
The Paragon, Bath, a Georgian street in the Walcot area of Bath
 The Paragon, Blackheath, London, built by Michael Searles
The Paragon, Singapore, a shopping mall
Siam Paragon, a shopping complex in Bangkok, Thailand
McLaren Technology Centre, formerly called the Paragon Technology Centre
Hull Paragon Interchange, a railway station and transportation complex in Kingston upon Hull, England
Paragon International School (Cambodia), a private school in Phnom Penh, Cambodia
Paragon International University, a private university in Phnom Penh, Cambodia

Companies 
Paragon China, a British manufacturer of bone china
Paragon Gaming, an American casino company
Paragon Group of Companies, a British mortgage lender
Paragon Software, a video game company founded in 1987
Paragon Software Group, a software company founded in 1994
Paragon Space Development Corporation, a space hardware company
Paragon Studios, a video game company founded in 2007
Parragon Books Ltd, a United Kingdom publishing company

In arts and entertainment

In comics
Paragon (Cooper Roth), Marvel Comics superhero
Paragon (Maya), a fictional character in the video game Marvel Nemesis: Rise of the Imperfects
Paragon (DC Comics), a fictional supervillain published by DC Comics

In gaming
Paragon (video game), a cancelled MOBA video game
Paragon: The Overprime (video game), a MOBA video game by SoulEVE Netmarble
Paragon, an elite member of Dwarven society, revered like a god by Dwarves in the game Dragon Age: Origins
Paragon, one of the professions available in the PC game Guild Wars Nightfall
Paragon City, a fictional city in the computer game City of Heroes
Paragon Levels, a leveling system in the computer game Diablo 3
Paragon points, a type of scoring/level system in the game series Mass Effect
Paragon, a solid-state pinball table from Bally Manufacturing.

In music
Paragon (album), a 2004 album by Exists
"Paragon", a song by Northlane from the album Mesmer, 2017
Paragon (band), a heavy metal band from Germany
The Paragons, a ska and rocksteady vocal group from Kingston, Jamaica
Paragon cymbals, a line of cymbals made by Sabian, designed specifically for drummer Neil Peart

Other uses in arts and entertainment
JBL Paragon, an iconic loudspeaker system from JBL
John Paragon (1954–2021), actor, writer, and director
Paragon, a sentient vessel from Robin Hobb's Liveship Traders Trilogy

Other uses
Paragon (typography), the size of type between great primer and double pica, standardized as 20-point
Paragon (diamond), a diamond that originated in Brazil weighing 137.82 carats
Paragon CRT, a method of corneal refraction developed by Paragon Vision Sciences
Intel Paragon, a series of massively parallel supercomputers
HMS Paragon, the name of two ships of the Royal Navy
Paragon, a mountain bike in the Gary Fisher Collection

See also
Paragons (disambiguation)